Sweet Nice Continental Cycling Team is a Malaysian UCI Continental cycling team focusing on road bicycle racing. Teng Soon Sik and Fariman Zulkifli are the founders.

Team roster

Major wins
2020
 National Time Trial Championships, Muradjan Khalmuratov

National champions
2020
 Uzbekistan Time trial champion, Muradjan Khalmuratov

References

External links

Cycling teams based in Malaysia
Cycling teams established in 2021
2021 establishments in Malaysia
UCI Continental Teams (Asia)